Trachelocyphoides setulosus is a species of beetle in the family Carabidae, the only species in the genus Trachelocyphoides.

References

Pterostichinae